The 2017 AFC U-20 Futsal Championship was the first edition of the AFC U-20 Futsal Championship, the biennial international futsal championship organised by the Asian Football Confederation (AFC) for the men's youth national teams of Asia. The tournament was hosted by Thailand between 16 and 26 May 2017. Iran and Thailand had signaled their intent to host the inaugural competition.

A total of 21 teams participated in the tournament. The 21 teams were divided into four groups (one with six teams and three with five teams), with the group winners and runners-up advancing to the quarter-finals.

The tournament served as qualifying for the futsal tournament at the 2018 Summer Youth Olympics in Buenos Aires, with the winner and the runner-up qualifying for the boys' tournament, to be represented by their under-18 representative teams.

Qualified teams
Of the 47 AFC member associations, a total of 22 teams entered the competition. There was no qualification, and all entrants advanced to the final tournament. Saudi Arabia initially entered but decided to withdraw prior to the draw.

 (withdrew)

 (hosts)

Venues
The matches were played at the Bangkok Arena and Indoor Stadium Huamark in Bangkok.

Draw
The draw for the final tournament was held on 30 March 2017, 15:00 ICT (UTC+7), at the Grand Fourwings Convention Hotel in Bangkok. The 21 teams were drawn into one group of six teams (Group A) and three groups of five teams (Groups B, C and D), with the hosts Thailand automatically assigned to position A1 in the draw. As there were no previous editions, the teams were seeded according to the performances of their senior teams in the 2016 AFC Futsal Championship.

Squads

Players born after 1 January 1997 were eligible to compete in the tournament. Each team must register a squad of 14 players, minimum two of whom must be goalkeepers (Regulations Articles 27.1 and 27.2).

Match officials
Referees

 Ryan Shepherd
 Darius Turner
 Osama Saeed Idrees
 Liu Jianqiao
 Lee Po-fu
 Vahid Arzpeyma Mohammreh
 Hasan Al-Gburi
 Hawkar Salar Ahmed
 Takeshi Fujita
 Hiroyuki Harada
 Husein Mahmoud Khalaileh
 Nurdin Bukuev
 Mohamad Chami
 Helday Idang
 Rey Ritaga Martinez
 Azat Hajypolatov
 Khamis Al-Shamsi
 Anatoliy Rubakov
 Trương Quốc Dũng

Group stage
The top two teams of each group advanced to the quarter-finals.

Tiebreakers
Teams were ranked according to points (3 points for a win, 1 point for a draw, 0 points for a loss), and if tied on points, the following tiebreaking criteria were applied, in the order given, to determine the rankings (Regulations Article 10.5):
Points in head-to-head matches among tied teams;
Goal difference in head-to-head matches among tied teams;
Goals scored in head-to-head matches among tied teams;
If more than two teams are tied, and after applying all head-to-head criteria above, a subset of teams are still tied, all head-to-head criteria above are reapplied exclusively to this subset of teams;
Goal difference in all group matches;
Goals scored in all group matches;
Penalty shoot-out if only two teams are tied and they met in the last round of the group;
Disciplinary points (yellow card = 1 point, red card as a result of two yellow cards = 3 points, direct red card = 3 points, yellow card followed by direct red card = 4 points);
Drawing of lots.

All times are local, ICT (UTC+7).

Group A

Group B

Group C

Group D

Knockout stage
In the knockout stage, extra time and penalty shoot-out were used to decide the winner if necessary, except for the third place match where penalty shoot-out (no extra time) was used to decide the winner if necessary (Regulations Articles 14.1 and 15.1).

Bracket

Quarter-finals

Semi-finals
Winners qualified for 2018 Summer Youth Olympics boys' futsal tournament, to be represented by their under-18 representative teams.

Third place match

Final

Winners

Qualified teams for Youth Olympics
The following two teams from AFC qualified for the 2018 Summer Youth Olympics boys' futsal tournament.

Notes
Since teams from the same association cannot play in both the Youth Olympics boys' and girls' tournaments, if teams from the same association qualify for both tournaments, they must nominate their preferred qualification team, and the next best ranked team will qualify instead if one of the qualified teams are not nominated.
As participation in team sports (Futsal, Beach handball, Field hockey, and Rugby sevens) are limited to one team per gender for each National Olympic Committee (NOC), the participating teams of the 2018 Youth Olympics futsal tournament will be confirmed by mid-2018 after each qualified NOC confirms their participation and any unused qualification places are reallocated.

Awards
The following awards were given at the conclusion of the tournament:

Goalscorers

Broadcasting rights

See also
2018 AFC Women's Futsal Championship
Futsal at the 2018 Summer Youth Olympics

References

External links
, the-AFC.com
AFC U20 Futsal Championship 2017, stats.the-AFC.com

2017
U-20 Futsal Championship
2017 in youth association football
Afc Boys
International futsal competitions hosted by Thailand
2017 in Thai football
Sport in Bangkok
May 2017 sports events in Asia